The Princess Diaries, Volume VII: Party Princess, released in the United Kingdom as The Princess Diaries: Seventh Heaven, is a young adult book in the Princess Diaries series.  Written by Meg Cabot, it was released in 2006 by Harper Collins Publishers and is the seventh novel in the series.

Plot Summary
When Mia Thermopolis bankrupts the student government buying high-tech recycling bins, she needs to raise $5,000 soon, so that she can pay for the seniors' commencement ceremony. All her friends (including her long-time boyfriend and so-called love of her life Michael Moscovitz) mention selling candles, but Mia absolutely refuses, so Grand-mère comes up with a solution: a musical, Braid! written and directed by Grand-mère, starring Mia and her friends, portraying the achievements of Mia's famous Genovian ancestor, Rosagunde. Mia is thrilled, yet quite worried to be cast as the lead. She attempts to drop out, but Grand-mère threatens to tell the seniors that Mia had bankrupted the student government (making them angry that she had not saved money for the commencement ceremony). Braid! also results in a new-found friendship between Mia and "The Guy Who Hates It When They Put Corn In The Chili", aka J.P. - Mia's on-stage love interest, who turns out to be an aspiring screenwriter.

Michael mentions his parents are going away for the weekend and he plans on having a party. Mia starts to worry she isn't enough of a party girl. She even (as a last resort, of course) asks her archenemy, Lana Weinberger, how to act like a "Party Girl". Mia does what Lana says and it all ends in tragedy. After she drinks and "sexy dances" with J.P., her relationship with Michael seems to be on rocky ground, especially as Michael's parents are splitting up and he is being an absent boyfriend. Her friendship with J.P. seems to be going the same way thanks to Lilly's new literary magazine, "Fat Louie's Pink Butthole", which includes "No More Corn!" a story Mia wrote (before meeting him) about J.P. killing himself. However, Principal Gupta immediately bans the magazine and confiscates all the copies, as Lilly has submitted five explicit stories to it, meaning that J.P. never sees Mia's story.

Mia's friendship with Lilly also hits a rough patch after Mia kisses J.P. (on the cheek) as a sign of gratitude for being a supportive friend and Lilly (who clearly has a crush on J.P.) stops speaking to Mia.  
 
The play is performed at the Aide de Ferme, a benefit for Genovian olive oil farmers that Grand-mère puts on. Everyone who is anyone attends, but, before the last scene, Mia is worried about her on-stage kiss with J.P. Then Michael shows up in J.P.'s costume and gives her a perfect kiss and they talk about their problems, and, once again, their relationship appears to be strong. Grand-mère also raises enough money to help the Genovian farmers and Mia, solving her problems.

References

2006 American novels
American young adult novels
The Princess Diaries novels
HarperCollins books